John Gardner Crandall Jr. (April 10, 1931 – August 23, 2008) was an American football coach.  He was the third head football coach for at Azusa Pacific College—now known as Azusa Pacific University—in Azusa, California, serving for three seasons, from 1967 to 1969, and compiling a record of 6–19–1.

Crandall died of cancer in Wichita, Kansas in 2008.

References

1931 births
2008 deaths
Azusa Pacific Cougars football coaches
People from Mount Vernon, Missouri
Deaths from cancer in Kansas